The 13th Annual Honda Civic Tours was a concert tour that showcasing three distinct genres of music, as well as becoming a significant pillar of the new Honda Stage music platform.  Alternative rock bands Grouplove and Portugal. The Man co-headlined the first tour which kicked off on August 10, 2014, in Seattle. This tour included support acts Typhoon and Tokyo Police Club on various dates. The second of three tours with Brooklyn-based pop/rock band American Authors began on October 1, 2014.  Support for the second tour included Echosmith, The Mowgli's and Oh Honey on select dates. Additionally, Latin DJ trio 3BallMTY will headline the final tour of the series which began in mid-November and ran through December 21, 2014.

Opening acts
Typhoon 
Tokyo Police Club 
Echosmith 
The Mowgli's 
Oh Honey

Set list

Grouplove

"I'm With You"	
"Itchin' on a Photograph"	
"Lovely Cup"
"Raspberry"	
"Shark Attack"	
"Hippy Hill"	
"Schoolboy"	
"Tongue Tied"	
"Drunk in Love" (Beyoncé cover)	
"Bitin' the Bullet"
"Slow"	
"Borderlines and Aliens"
"Ways to Go"
"Colours"
Encore
"Baba O'Riley" (The Who cover) (with Portugal. The Man)

American Authors

"Home"
"Heart of Stone"
"Believer"
"Luck"
"Ghost"
"Trouble"
"Yellow" (Coldplay cover)
"Think About It"	
"Nothing Better"
"Love"
"Stay with Me" (Sam Smith cover)
"Hit It"
"Best Day of My Life"
Encore
"Keep Me Dreaming"
"Oh, What a Life"

Tour dates

References

2014 concert tours
Co-headlining concert tours